Brandt Clarke (born February 9, 2003) is a Canadian junior ice hockey defenceman for the Barrie Colts of the Ontario Hockey League (OHL) and he is a prospect for the Los Angeles Kings of the National Hockey League (NHL). He was drafted eighth overall by the Los Angeles Kings in the 2021 NHL Entry Draft.  In November 2021, Brandt was named Captain of the Barrie Colts for the 2021–22 OHL season, becoming the 22nd captain in Colts history.

Playing career
On April 6, 2019 and marking the end of his high-profile minor hockey career, Clarke was drafted in the first round, fourth overall in the 2019 OHL Priority Selection to play major junior hockey with the Barrie Colts. Playing as a rookie for the Barrie Colts in what turned out to be the COVID-19-shortened 2019–20 season, Clarke led all rookie OHL defensemen, scoring six goals and 32 assists and he was considered a lock to go in the first round of the 2021 NHL Entry Draft. At the conclusion of the 2019–20 season, Clarke was named to the OHL First All-Rookie Team, as selected by the OHL's General Managers.

In the following season (2020–21) when the entire OHL regular season was cancelled due to COVID-19, Clarke was able to continue his development by playing professional men's hockey in Slovakia, on loan to HC Nové Zámky of the Tipsport Liga, scoring five goals with ten assists while playing a partial season of only 26 games.

On July 23, 2021, Clarke was selected in the first-round, eighth overall, by the Los Angeles Kings in the 2021 NHL Entry Draft.  Clarke was soon signed to a three-year, entry-level contract with the Kings on August 10, 2021. 

In the  NHL season, Clarke made his NHL regular-season debut for the Los Angeles Kings in a home game against the Seattle Kraken on October 13, 2022. Clarke collected his first career NHL point, an assist, during a road game against the Pittsburgh Penguins on October 20, 2022, making Clarke the 7th youngest defenceman and 18th youngest player in Kings history to record a point. When in Los Angeles, Clarke – the NHL’s second-youngest defenseman during the 2022–23 season – billets at the home of Jonathan Quick, the Kings' goaltender and oldest player this season. During the 2022-23 season, Clarke played 21 competitive games, split between the L.A. Kings (9 NHL games), Ontario Reign (5 AHL games) and Team Canada (7 IIHF World Junior Championship U20 games), on top of 12 exhibition games at a variety of elite levels, before being re-assigned on January 6, 2023 by the L.A. Kings to the Barrie Colts for the remainder of the 2022–23 OHL season.

Clarke is a high-quality defensive player with excellent defensive stick control and tactical positioning; however, he is a new-era defenseman best known for his offensive capabilities and his eagerness and creativity while breaking out of the defensive zone and while participating actively in the offensive zone.

International play

 

Clarke won Gold playing for Team Canada in the 2021 IIHF World U18 Championships, averaging a point-per-game. The tournament was held in Frisco, Texas, USA from April 26, 2021 to May 6, 2021. Clarke was named to the tournament All-Star team, as selected by the media.

Clarke was selected to participate in Hockey Canada's National Junior Team Summer Camp (held in Calgary, Alberta from July 23-27, 2022) for the 2022-23 National Junior Team that participated in the 2023 World Junior Ice Hockey Championships that was held in Halifax, Nova Scotia and Moncton, New Brunswick, Canada from December 26, 2022 to January 5, 2023.  On December 7, 2022, it was announced that the L.A. Kings loaned Clarke to Canada’s world junior hockey team ahead of its Selection Camp for the 2023 World Junior Ice Hockey Championships.

On December 12, 2022, Clarke was named to Team Canada to compete at the 2023 World Junior Ice Hockey Championships. During the tournament, Clarke scored two goals and recorded six assists in seven games, including an assist on the final game-winning goal in overtime. Team Canada won the Gold medal in overtime against Czechia on January 5, 2023.

Personal life
Clarke is the younger brother of New Jersey Devils prospect Graeme Clarke.  Clarke's father, Chris Clarke, played junior hockey in Southern Ontario, Canada.

Career statistics

Regular season and playoffs

International

Awards and honours

 OHL Player of the Week (January 24-30, 2022)
 OHL Defenceman of the Month (January 2022)
 OHL Coaches Poll for the 2021-22 Regular Season: 1st in East for "Best Offensive Defenceman"; Tied for 1st in East for "Smartest Player"; and 3rd in East for "Best Stickhandler".
 2021-22 Red Tilson Trophy Nominee for the OHL's Most Outstanding Player.
 OHL Defenceman of the Month (January 2023)
 CHL Team of the Month (January 2023)
 Most Points by a Defenceman in Barrie Colts History
 OHL Defenceman of the Month (February 2023)
 OHL Player of the Week (March 13-19, 2023)

References

External links
 

2003 births
Living people
Barrie Colts players
Canadian ice hockey defencemen
Ice hockey people from Ottawa
Los Angeles Kings draft picks
Los Angeles Kings players
National Hockey League first-round draft picks
Ontario Reign (AHL) players
HC Nové Zámky players
Canadian expatriate ice hockey players in Slovakia
Canadian expatriate ice hockey players in the United States